Gen4 Energy, Inc (formerly Hyperion Power Generation, Inc.) was a privately held corporation formed to construct and sell several designs of relatively small (70 MW thermal, 25 MW electric) nuclear reactors, which they claimed would be modular, inexpensive, inherently safe, and proliferation-resistant. According to news coverage, these reactors could be used for heat generation, production of electricity, and other purposes, including desalination.

The company went out of business on the 1st of April 2018, after losing out on a second round of grants from the Department of Energy in January 2016.

Revised 2009 design: uranium nitride fueled, lead-bismuth cooled reactor
Hyperion announced in November 2009 that, despite their continued intentions to pursue the self-moderated uranium hydride reactor, urgent customer needs for a rapidly licensable and deployable reactor are causing them to choose another LANL design for initial commercialization. They are moving forward with a more conventional Generation IV reactor design:  a uranium nitride fueled, lead-bismuth cooled reactor.  Using a liquid-metal-cooled fast reactor should speed the time to commercialization over the more revolutionary uranium hydride, self-moderating design that had previously been publicly discussed.

Fuel and coolant selection

According to Hyperion, the uranium nitride fuel incorporated in the design is generally similar in physical characteristics and neutronics to the standard ceramic uranium oxide fuel that is used at present in modern light water nuclear reactors. However, it has certain beneficial traits - higher thermal conductivity - and thus less retained heat energy - that make it preferable over oxide fuels when used at temperature regimes that are greater than the  temperatures found in light water reactors. By operating at higher temperatures, steam plants can operate at a higher thermal efficiency. The presentation by Hyperion at the ANS 2009 conference mentions the use of the Doppler inherent negative temperature coefficient of reactivity in this reactor as a means of control. Nuclear scientist Alexander Sesonske avers that nitride fuels have both received very little development (as of 1973) and seem to have a very favorable combination of physical properties - especially in fast reactors. Whether this carries over to lead-bismuth cooled reactors is a question not answered in the reviewed literature, though the Soviet Union has worked with this type of reactor before in naval service; in particular, the Alfa class submarine - well known in the West for its high speed operation - was driven by such a lead-bismuth reactor which is known to have worked very effectively.

The Hyperion module has sufficient fuel for 3650 full power days at 70 MWth, is capable of load following, and is meant to be built in pairs; one module can be at power, while another can be under installation or uninstallation at the same time, ensuring reliable supply of electricity.

Thermal hydraulics, energy production and extraction

Hyperion plans to use natural circulation of the lead-bismuth coolant through the reactor module as a means of primary cooling. Two schemes of power generation exist at this point: either using superheated steam or supercritical carbon dioxide to drive Rankine cycle or Brayton cycle turbines. In addition to the classical use of power generation, further uses for the heated working fluid can include desalinization, process heat, and district heating and cooling.

The thermal hydraulics of the lead-bismuth reactor are dictated by the high heat capacity and unique properties of the lead-bismuth eutectic coolant. This coolant has several extremely beneficial properties for a reactor: it is opaque to gamma radiation, but transparent to neutron flux; it melts easily at a low temperature, but does not boil until an extremely high temperature is reached; it does not greatly expand or contract when exposed to heat or cold; it has a high heat capacity; it will naturally circulate through the reactor core without pumps being required - whether during normal operation or as a means of residual decay heat removal; and it will solidify once decay heat from a used reactor has dropped to a low level.

Licensing strategy

Hyperion intended to pursue the licensing of the uranium nitride, lead-bismuth small reactor with the U.S. Nuclear Regulatory Commission (NRC), though the firm's deployment schedule (the target date for deployment was for the end of 2013) as well as indications from senior personnel within Hyperion indicates that perhaps the reactor will bypass the normal lengthy NRC process for commercial reactors and will instead be initially deployed by the U.S. Department of Energy or the U.S. Department of Defense, not subject to NRC regulation, or that Hyperion will seek a 10CFR50.21 Class 104 Research and Development reactor license from the NRC.
 Hyperion expects to apply to the NRC for regulatory approval "within a year."

Hyperion had considered additional manufacturing sites outside the US, including United Kingdom and a location in Asia.

Competing designs 
See List of small nuclear reactor designs
 NuScale
 Toshiba 4S
 mPower by Babcock & Wilcox Company
 TerraPower

References

External links
 

Nuclear reactors
Nuclear power companies of the United States